Una ragazza piuttosto complicata (internationally released as A Complicated Girl) is a 1968 Italian giallo film directed by Damiano Damiani. For her performance in this film and in Metti una sera a cena, Florinda Bolkan was awarded with a Golden Plate at the 1968 Edition of David di Donatello.

Plot 
A man plugs into a phone call between two lesbian lovers. Intrigued by the very special situation he decides to know one of the two girls and to become his lover. Problems arise when the other woman seeks to end their relationship.

Cast 
 Catherine Spaak: Claudia 
 Florinda Bolkan: Greta 
 Jean Sorel: Alberto 
 Gigi Proietti: Pietro 
 Luciano Catenacci
 Gabriella Grimaldi
 María Cuadra

References

External links

1968 films
Films directed by Damiano Damiani
Giallo films
1960s crime thriller films
Italian LGBT-related films
1960s Italian films